Viduslaiki ("The Middle Ages") is a solo album by Ingus Baušķenieks, released in 2003. The album is Baušķenieks' first solo album, released by "Ingus Baušķenieka ieraksti". The album was recorded in Baušķenieks' home studio from 1999–2000.

Track listing
 Vēss vērmelēm (instr.) – 3:50
 Ķirbis Irbis (featuring Uģis Vītiņš) – 3:32
 Pasaulīte pilna vārdu – 4:21
 Vēss vērmelēm	- 4:58
 Vai mums viss ir ļauts? – 4:57
 Vissaldākās sēnes uz mēness – 5:18
 Es laižos kā sapnī – 7:10
 Man dvēsele vien – 4:43
 Tu & tavs autobuss – 4:06

References 

2003 albums